The Sound of Raasay is the sound between the islands of Raasay and Skye.

See also

 Inner Sound, Scotland
 Isle of Skye
 Loch Kishorn
 Mealt Waterfall
 Quiraing

References

External links and references

 One link, mentions Raasay's depth

Landforms of the Inner Hebrides
Raasay
Landforms of Highland (council area)